Martin Ingerman (March 9, 1936 – October 21, 2015), known professionally as Marty Ingels, was an American actor, comedian, comedy sketch writer and theatrical agent, who is best known as the co-star of the 1960s television series I'm Dickens, He's Fenster.

Early life
Ingels was born as Martin Ingerman to a Jewish family in 1936 in the Brooklyn borough of New York City, the son of Jacob and Minnie (née Crown) Ingerman. His uncle was Abraham Beame, the mayor of New York City from 1974 to 1977.

Career

Ingels' acting career dates back to the early 1960s. He had his own short-lived ABC television series, I'm Dickens, He's Fenster (1962–63) with John Astin, which lasted one season of thirty-two episodes.

He guest-starred on the CBS sitcoms Pete and Gladys, The Ann Sothern Show, and Hennesey. He also appeared in one episode of ABC's Bewitched as "Diaper Dan", who plants a microphone bug in Tabitha's rattle so a competing advertising agency can scoop and steal Darrin's ideas. He appeared twice as Sol Pomeroy, an army buddy of the character Rob Petrie, on CBS's The Dick Van Dyke Show. In 1978, Ingels guest starred in Season Two, Episode One of The Love Boat.

His voice-overs and commercials include those for Paul Masson wines, with his uniquely raspy voice. He played Autocat in the Motormouse and Autocat cartoons featured first on The Cattanooga Cats and then in a series of their own, and was Beegle Beagle in The Great Grape Ape Show. He was also the voice of the title character in the animated series adaptation of the 1980 video game Pac-Man. As late as 2010, Ingels was cast in an episode of CBS's CSI: Crime Scene Investigation.

He also acted in films, including Armored Command (1961), The Horizontal Lieutenant (1962), Wild and Wonderful (1964), The Busy Body (1967), A Guide for the Married Man (1967), For Singles Only (1968), The Picasso Summer (1969), If It's Tuesday, This Must Be Belgium (1969), Linda Lovelace for President (1975), and Instant Karma (1990). Beginning in the 1970s, Ingels worked primarily as an agent, specializing in representing actors in celebrity endorsement ads.

Personal life
Ingels was married twice: first to Jean Marie Frassinelli in 1960 (they divorced in 1969 after nine years of marriage); later to singer and actress Shirley Jones on November 13, 1977. Despite some drastically different personalities and several separations (Shirley filed, then withdrew, and later had a divorce petition in 2002), the couple remained married until his death in 2015.

Death
Ingels died from a massive stroke at Tarzana Medical Center in Tarzana, California, on October 21, 2015, at the age of 79. He was survived by his wife, Shirley Jones, and his stepsons. After Ingels' death, Jones stated "He often drove me crazy, but there's not a day I won’t miss him and love him to my core."

Legal issues
Ingels was also known for frequent legal actions, so much that in his obituary in The New York Times Margalit Fox wrote: "[Ingels] always seemed to be suing someone, and someone always seemed to be suing him".

In 1993, Ingels sued actress June Allyson for his agency commission. Allyson had appeared in commercials for Depend, and Ingels alleged he was not paid his proper commission as her agent. Allyson denied wrongdoing and countersued. Ingels pleaded no contest to making harassing phone calls to Allyson.

In 2003, he sued radio personality Tom Leykis and Westwood One, saying that comments made about him constituted age discrimination. Ingels had called into Leykis's radio program objecting to the content, and Leykis declared on the air that Ingels was "not just older than my demographic, you’re the grandfather of my demographic." In June 2005, Ingels's lawsuit was dismissed and Ingels was ordered to pay Leykis's $25,000 in legal fees.

Filmography

Film

Television

Video games

References

External links
 
 C.A. Rejects Age Bias Suit Over Exclusion From Radio Talk Show
 An Interview with Marty Ingels Part One, June 2012
 An Interview with Marty Ingels Part Two, June 2012
 An Interview with Marty Ingels Part Three, July 2012
 Marty Ingels(Aveleyman)
 Marty Ingels Interview: A Brooklyn Wisecracker With Hutzpah Who Became A TV Icon

1936 births
2015 deaths
20th-century American comedians
20th-century American male actors
American male comedians
American male film actors
American male television actors
American male voice actors
Comedians from California
Comedians from New York City
Erasmus Hall High School alumni
Jewish American male actors
Jewish American comedians
Male actors from Los Angeles
Male actors from New York City
People from Brooklyn
21st-century American Jews